The Saranac Lake Surge are an independent American professional baseball team based in Saranac Lake, New York. The Surge play in the Empire Professional Baseball League, which is not affiliated with Major League Baseball.

History 
In 2015, the Surge was set to be a member of the East Coast Baseball League. The team was to be managed by Scott "Skip" Nathanson. Prior to the planned start of the ECBL's first season the American teams, including the Surge, pulled out of the league to form the North Country Baseball League. For its first four years of existence, the team was based in Old Orchard Beach, Maine.

2015 season 
The Surge posted a record of 18–21 in the startup league. The Surge promoted ten players to the Atlantic League, the American Association, and the Frontier League.

2016 season 
The Surge were announced to play in the newly formed Empire Baseball League. On December 22, Skip Nathanson and Alex Markakis agreed to terms to return for the 2016 season.

2019 season 
The Surge relocated to Saranac Lake, New York, for the 2019 season. On July 4, 2019, they played their first game in Saranac Lake versus the Road City Explorers.

Players

References

Professional baseball teams in Maine
Sports in Old Orchard Beach, Maine
2015 establishments in Maine
Baseball teams established in 2015
Professional baseball teams in New York (state)
Saranac Lake, New York